ByWater Solutions is a privately owned and funded company founded in California in March 2009 by CEO Brendan A. Gallagher and EVP Nathan A. Curulla, which provides implementation, hosting, support, consultation, and development services for the Koha Integrated Library System.

History
After the founding of ByWater Solutions in 2009, Gallagher began contributing to the Koha community by way of small developmental fixes. ByWater signed their first contract in June 2009. Since that time, ByWater has grown to a Koha dedicated staff of 25, and supports over 1,100 library sites (including publics, schools, academic, small non profits and special libraries) within North America. Since its founding, ByWater has also partnered with other open source software companies worldwide to work on improving the Koha project both with documentation and developments.

Origin of the company name
ByWater Solutions is named after a village in J. R. R. Tolkien's epic trilogy The Lord of the Rings. Bywater is a village which is situated in close proximity to the Shire, the home of Bilbo and Frodo Baggins, who are the two main characters in the story. Bywater was known primarily for the Inn of the Green Dragon, a central meeting place for travelers and adventurers in the story. The Inn was a hub for the collaboration and exchange of news and ideas in the world of Middle Earth, and thus resembles the environment found in Koha and Open Source Software in general. Because of the company's primary dealings with libraries worldwide, the founders thought that it was important to incorporate a literary reference to the name of the company, and being lifelong childhood friends, this literary work has personal value to them both.

Partnerships 
In March 2015, EBSCO Information Services and ByWater Solutions partnered together to allow libraries that use Koha ILS to easily integrate EBSCO Discovery Service™. Since then ByWater has expressed their commitment to support the FOLIO Library Services Platform project in partnership with Ebsco.

Honors
In 2015, ByWater Solutions was recognized by Inc. Magazine as being one of the top 5,000 fastest growing business in the United States. ByWater was ranked number 3,862 out of the 5,000 businesses highlighted in the magazine’s annual spotlight. ByWater Solutions received the Platinum recognition in the 2017 Modern Library Awards.

References

Free software companies
Library automation
Library-related organizations
Software companies based in California
Software companies based in Connecticut
Companies based in Santa Barbara, California
Companies based in New Haven, Connecticut
American companies established in 2009
Software companies established in 2009
Software companies of the United States
2009 establishments in California
Things named after Tolkien works